Shambulbina may refer to:
Şambul, Azerbaijan
Şambulbinə, Azerbaijan